Frans Dictus (5 May 1907 – 21 January 1994) was a Belgian racing cyclist. He rode in the 1934 Tour de France.

References

1907 births
1994 deaths
Belgian male cyclists
Place of birth missing